Factory International is a cultural space currently being built in Manchester, England, which is to be the permanent home of the Manchester International Festival (MIF).

It is designed by the international practice Office for Metropolitan Architecture (OMA), founded by Rem Koolhaas and will be their first major, permanent cultural building in the United Kingdom.

Work commissioned for Factory International will go on to be presented internationally, whilst MIF will continue to take place every two years.

History 
Plans to build Factory International were announced in December 2014 by then Chancellor, George Osborne, who pledged a £78 million investment as part of the Northern Powerhouse programme. Factory International was backed by Manchester City Council, which stated that the venue would "play an integral part in helping Manchester and the north of England provide a genuine cultural counterbalance to London".

The Government announced that, from 1 April 2018, they would provide Arts Council England with an additional £9 million per annum to offer revenue support to Factory.

Manchester City Council granted planning permission for the building in January 2017, announcing at the same time that MIF will operate the centre with Mark Ball, the former artistic director of the London International Festival of Theatre.

Location 
Factory International is being constructed on the former site of Granada Studios, where Coronation Street and other TV shows were filmed and is located within St John's, a "new cultural community for Manchester" being developed by Allied London, which purchased the site with Manchester City Council.

Factory International's development coincides with that of the adjacent Science and Industry Museum, which "will become part of the creative public realm, with MSI's creative science ... balancing the creative and cultural production of Factory." The museum is building a new £6 million Special Exhibition Gallery alongside Factory International; the new gallery was set to be complete by 2020.

Factory International is situated next to the River Irwell and is close to other city centre cultural sites, including the People's History Museum, John Rylands Library, the Opera House, HOME and the Royal Exchange Theatre.

Design 
The OMA was selected to design Factory International following an international competition.

The warehouse will have a capacity of up to 5,000 and the auditorium up to 1,600 seated. The warehouse and auditorium can present events simultaneously, and the warehouse will also have the ability to be divided into two spaces by an acoustic wall. Both spaces can also be combined to create and present different types and scales of events. Two public squares on the north and west sides of the building also make up the Factory International site and the scheme includes the restoration and reuse of the northern brick arched portion of the Grade II-listed Colonnaded Railway Viaduct.

Programming 
MIF will occupy and run Factory International, creating a year-round programme that builds on the art that it commissions and presents for the 18-day festival, which takes place every two years.

Like MIF, Factory International's programme will focus on premieres of new work by creators and artists developed in partnership with other festivals, producers and organisations. Similar to MIF, much of the work created will go on to be presented around the world.

The programme will include around 10 large-scale commissions each year, as well as major exhibitions and up to 80 live music events. It will also receive productions from around the world and host events in its outdoor public squares.

Factory International will run a year-round Creative Engagement programme, building on MIF's existing programme of work, which gives opportunities for people from different backgrounds and ages from across Manchester to volunteer, perform in festival events, participate in creative activities, learn new skills and showcase their work.

Factory International will work with and within local communities across Greater Manchester involving them as artistic collaborators in participatory projects and productions shaped by them.

MIF will continue to take place every two years, bringing new work to venues and found spaces across Greater Manchester, working with the region's cultural organisations.

Pre-Factory events 
In the run up to Factory International, MIF is commissioning and presenting a series of artists and events. Pre-Factory commissions have included Akram Khan’s Giselle; Thomas Ostermeier’s Returning to Reims; Available Light by composer John Adams, choreographer Lucinda Childs and architect Frank Gehry; Everything that happened and would happen by German composer and artist Heiner Goebbels; Special Edition, a series of musical offerings presented with The Warehouse Project; Invisible Cities, a co-commission between MIF, 59 Productions and Rambert; Ivo Van Hove’s The Fountainhead; Rafael Lozano-Hemmer’s Atmospheric Memory; and To The Moon by Laurie Anderson.

Virtual Factory 
In July 2020, MIF launched Virtual Factory, a series of online commissions by leading international artists, inspired by Factory International, its architecture and the history of the site. The first commission was Your Progress Will Be Saved, by the artist avatar LaTurbo Avedon, in which Factory International was built in the global gaming platform Fortnite Creative. Future artists include Jenn Nkiru, Tai Shani and Robert Yang.

Opening programme 
In September 2022, Factory International announced their opening programme. It included Free Your Mind, an immersive Matrix films-themed dance, music and visual effects experience directed by Danny Boyle, You Me and the Balloons, the world's biggest ever show by Yayoi Kusama, and The Welcome, a series of special events and performances curated by the people of Greater Manchester.

Training and employment 
Factory International delivers a skills, engagement and training programme under the banner the Factory Academy. Over five years it is expected to create up to 1,400 fully funded skills and training places, particularly targeted at young people, providing an entry point to work in the creative industries, and reach up to 10,000 young people in the region through further learning and engagement opportunities. Factory International is anticipated to bring 1,500 full time jobs and add up to £1.1 billion to Manchester's economy over a decade. It will also offer a skills, training and engagement programme for people living across Greater Manchester.

The Factory Academy is backed by the Greater Manchester Cultural Skills Consortium.

Since launching in 2018, the Factory Academy has delivered several projects. In January 2019, seven local people who were not in education or employment completed a seven-month traineeship with MIF in roles such as IT, digital, production, ticketing and development. In January 2020, five young people were employed as Creative Venue Technician apprentices with Consortium members.

People's Forum and Young People's Forum 
In early 2019, MIF launched the People's Forum, a group that meets regularly to help inform the development of MIF and Factory International. The group is made up of 15 members from across Greater Manchester, who were selected following an open call. A Young People's Forum has been running since early 2018, providing perspectives on youth culture and issues in Manchester.

The council also announced that an application for a new charity, The Factory Trust, to be chaired by Sir Howard Bernstein has been made to the Charities Commission. The council state that, "once the trust has charitable status, it will begin a programme of applications to Trusts and Foundations alongside approaches to individuals and corporations."

Timescale 
The timeframe of the project contains the following key milestones:
 July 2015 – issue of the contract for design services
 Mid-November 2015 – design team appointments
 January 2017 – planning application submission 
 February 2017 to December 2022 – construction
 Winter 2022 – MIF take ownership of Factory International
 June 2023 – opening

See also 

 Allied London
 Manchester City Council
 Manchester International Festival
 Museum of Science and Industry (Manchester)
 Office for Metropolitan Architecture
 Rem Koolhaas
 St John's Quarter

Further reading 
 151-page overview of the background and design of the factory:

References

Notes 
 The original timeline was as follows: 
 May 2016 – planning application submission
 January 2017 to December 2018 – construction
 January 2019 to June 2019 – commissioning of facilities and test events
 July 2019 – opening ceremony

 The revised timeline was as follows:
 End of 2019 – opening ceremony

Reference to Note 1
  point 5.0. Pdf.

Reference to Note 2
  Pdf.

External links 
 The Factory
 Developer's website
 The Factory on OMA's website

Buildings and structures in Manchester
Culture in Manchester
Music venues in Manchester
Performance art venues
Planned developments
Redevelopment projects in the United Kingdom
Theatres in Manchester
Tourist attractions in Manchester